License to Dream is the third album by American New York City based Kleeer.

Reception

Released in 1981, this album reached number thirteen on the Billboard Top Soul Albums chart, and the single "Get Tough" charted at number five on the  Dance chart and number fifteen on the Soul Singles chart.

Track listing
"De Kleeer Ting" (Norman Durham, Woody Cunningham)  4:41
"Running Back To You" (Woody Cunningham)  7:22
"Sippin' & Kissin'" (Norman Durham, Woody Cunningham)  4:15
"Hypnotized" (Richard Lee, Woody Cunningham)  3:40
"License to Dream" (Norman Durham, Woody Cunningham)  4:45
"Get Tough" (Norman Durham, Woody Cunningham)  8:17
"Say You Love Me" (Paul Crutchfield, Woody Cunningham)  4:41
"Where Would I Be (Without Your Love)" (Paul Crutchfield )  4:22

Personnel
 Norman Durham - Arp strings, bass, Clavinet, impersonations, percussion, vocals
Woody Cunningham - vongos, cowbell, drums, impersonations, Oberheim, percussion, timbales, vocals
Paul Crutchfield - congas, acoustic guitar, percussion, vocals
Terry Dolphin - Fender Rhodes, piano, vibraphone
Richard Lee - guitar
 Eric Rohrbaugh - Clavinet, Mini-Moog, sound effects
Isabelle Coles, Yvette Flowers - lead vocals and backing vocals
Carole Sylvan, Janice Pendarvis, Melanie Moore, Dennis King - backing vocals

Charts

Singles

References

External links
 Kleeer-License To Dream at Discogs

1981 albums
Kleeer albums
Atlantic Records albums